Franco Zucchi (born 16 December 1965) is an Italian rower. He competed at the 1988 Summer Olympics and the 1996 Summer Olympics.

References

1965 births
Living people
Italian male rowers
Olympic rowers of Italy
Rowers at the 1988 Summer Olympics
Rowers at the 1996 Summer Olympics